Ormskirk is a town in the West Lancashire district of Lancashire, England.   The town, including the neighbouring village of Westhead and surrounding countryside, contains 68 buildings recorded in the National Heritage List for England as designated listed buildings.  One is listed at Grade I, the highest of the three grades, three are at Grade II*, the middle grade, and the others are at Grade II, the lowest grade.  The oldest listed buildings are a church and the remains of a priory.  Many of the later listed buildings are houses and associated structures, and farmhouses and farm buildings.  Other listed buildings include public houses, churches and associated structures, public buildings, buildings associated with the railway, a water tower, a drinking fountain, a water pumping house, a clock tower, a statue, war memorials, and a telephone kiosk.


Key

Buildings

Notes and references

Notes

Citations

Sources

Lists of listed buildings in Lancashire
Buildings and structures in the Borough of West Lancashire
Ormskirk